The Medusa-class of submarines were eight submarines built for Italy and one for Portugal from 1911–1913. They displaced 305 tons while submerged, and could travel as fast as eight knots. The class consisted of the Vellella, Medusa, Argo, Jalea, Espadarte (built for Portugal), Fisalia, Zoea, Salpa, and Jantina. In 1918, the other five Italian submarines were stricken, while the Espadarte was in service until 1931.

References

External links
 Medusa-class subnarine Marina Militare website

Submarines of Italy
Submarine classes